Queens Park Rangers Football Club, commonly abbreviated to QPR, is a professional football club based in Shepherd's Bush, West London, England. After a nomadic early existence, they have played home matches at Loftus Road since 1917, other than two brief spells at the White City Stadium. They share rivalries with various other clubs, most notably they contest the West London derby.

The club was founded as Christchurch Rangers in 1882 and took up their current name after merging with St Judes Institute four years later. Having won the West London League in 1898–99, they joined both the Southern League and Western League. Having won titles in both leagues, they were elected to the Football League in 1920. They played in the Third Division South until winning promotion as champions in 1947–48. Relegated in 1952, they won the Third Division and League Cup in the 1966–67 season under the stewardship of Alec Stock. Promoted from the Second Division in 1967–68, they were relegated after one season in the First Division. QPR won promotion again in 1972–73 and then were runners-up to the English football champions in 1975–76 after finishing one point behind Liverpool. Relegated in 1979, they reached the FA Cup final as a second-tier club in 1982, losing to Tottenham Hotspur after a replay.

QPR won another Second Division title in 1982–83 and were beaten finalists in the 1986 League Cup final. They remained in the top-flight for thirteen years, becoming founder members of the Premier League in 1992, before they were relegated in 1996. Relegated again in 2001, they secured promotion from the third tier at the end of the 2003–04 campaign. QPR won promotion as winners of the Championship in 2010–11, though were relegated from the Premier League after two seasons. They won an immediate promotion via the play-offs in 2014, though were relegated again the following season and have remained in the Championship since that time.

History

1880s–1970s
The club was formed in 1886, when a team known as St Jude's (formed in 1884) merged with Christchurch Rangers (formed in 1882). The resulting team was called Queen's Park Rangers and their official formation date is considered to be 1882, which is the original founding date of Christchurch Rangers. The club's name came from the fact most of the players came from the Queen's Park area of west London. St Jude's Institute on Ilbert Street W10 is still in use as a community hall and in July 2011 club icon Stan Bowles unveiled a plaque celebrating its place in history.

QPR became a professional team in 1889. The club were elected into the Southern Football League in 1899. They first won the Southern Football League in 1907–08. As Southern League champions that year, they played in the first ever Charity Shield match, against the Football League champions, Manchester United. The club lost 4–0 in a replay after the first game had finished 1–1. Both games were played at Stamford Bridge.  QPR were Southern League champions for a second time in 1911-12.

The club joined the Football League in 1920, when the Third Division was formed, mainly with Southern League clubs. When the Third Division was split into North and South the following season, QPR, like most of the former Southern League clubs that had joined the Football League to form the Third Division, were in the Third Division (South).

QPR played their home games in nearly 20 different stadia (a league record), before permanently settling at Loftus Road in 1917, although the team would briefly attempt to attract larger crowds by playing at the White City Stadium for two short spells: 1931 to 1933, and the 1962–63 season.

The club were promoted as champions of Division 3 South in the 1947–48 season. Dave Mangnall was the manager as the club participated in four seasons of the Second Division, being relegated in 1951–52. Tony Ingham was signed from Leeds United and went on to make the most ever league appearances for QPR (519). Arguably the club's greatest ever manager, Alec Stock, arrived prior to the start of the 1959–60 season. The 1960–61 season saw QPR achieve their biggest win to date: 9–2 vs Tranmere Rovers in a Division 3 match. In time, Stock, together with Jim Gregory who arrived as chairman in the mid-1960s, helped to achieve a total transformation of the club and its surroundings.

In 1966–67, QPR won the Division Three championship and became the first Third Division club to win the League Cup on Saturday, 4 March 1967, beating West Bromwich Albion 3–2, coming back from a two-goal deficit. It is still the only major trophy that QPR have won. It was also the first League Cup final to be held at Wembley Stadium. After winning promotion in 1968 to the top flight for the first time in their history, Rangers were relegated after just one season and spent the next four years in Division Two. Terry Venables joined from Spurs at the beginning of the 1969–70 season and Rodney Marsh was sold to Manchester City. During this time, new QPR heroes emerged including Phil Parkes, Don Givens, Dave Thomas and Stan Bowles. These new signings were in addition to home-grown talent such as Dave Clement, Ian Gillard, Mick Leach and Gerry Francis.

In 1974, Dave Sexton joined as manager and, in 1975–76 led QPR to the runners-up spot in the First Division, missing out on the championship by one point with a squad containing seven England internationals and internationals from the home nations. After completing their 42-game season, QPR sat at the top of the league, one point ahead of Liverpool who went on to defeat Wolverhampton Wanderers to clinch the title. Wolves were relegated to the Second Division that same season. The late 1970s also saw some cup success with Rangers reaching the semi-finals of the League Cup and in their first entry into European football reached the quarter finals of the UEFA Cup losing to AEK Athens on penalties. Following Sexton's departure in 1977 the club eventually slipped into the Second Division in 1979.

1980s–1990s
In 1980, Terry Venables took over as manager and in 1981 the club installed an artificial turf pitch. In 1982 QPR, still playing in the Second Division, reached the FA Cup Final for the only time in the club's history, facing holders Tottenham Hotspur. Tottenham won 1–0 in a replay. The following season QPR went on to win the Second Division championship and returned to English football's top division. After a respectable fifth-place finish, and UEFA Cup qualification, the following year, Venables departed to become manager of Barcelona. In 1988 the club had a new chairman, 24-year-old Richard Thompson. Over the next seven years, various managers came and went from Loftus Road and the club spent many seasons finishing mid table but avoided relegation. The most successful season during this period was the 1987–88 season in which QPR finished fifth, missing out on a UEFA Cup campaign due to the ban on English clubs in European competition as a result of the Heysel Stadium disaster. They were also runners up in the 1986 League Cup, losing to Oxford United.

Gerry Francis, a key player in the 1970s QPR side who had proved himself as a successful manager with Bristol Rovers, was appointed manager in the summer of 1991. In the 1991–92 First Division campaign they finished mid-table in the league and were founder members of the new Premier League, finishing fifth, as top London club, in the 1992–93 inaugural season. Francis oversaw one of QPR's most famous victories, the 4–1 win at Old Trafford in front of live TV on New Year's Day 1992. Midway through the 1994–95 season Francis resigned and very quickly became manager of Tottenham Hotspur and Ray Wilkins was installed as player-manager. Wilkins led QPR to an eighth-place finish in the Premiership. In July 1995 the club's top goalscorer, Les Ferdinand, was sold for a club record fee of £6 million to Newcastle United.

QPR struggled throughout the following season and were relegated at the end of the 1995–96 season. QPR then competed in Division 1 until 2001 under a succession of managers. Gerry Francis returned in 1998; however, the 2000–2001 season proved to be a disaster, and Francis resigned in early 2001.

2000–present
Former player Ian Holloway became manager, but was unable to stop Rangers from being relegated to England's third tier for the first time for more than 30 years. Following the 2003–2004 season QPR returned to Division 1 and struggled for consistent form over the next two campaigns before Holloway was suspended amidst rumours of his impending departure for Leicester City. A poor series of results and lack of progress at the club saw Holloway's successors Gary Waddock and later John Gregory – both former players – fail to hold on to the manager's job.

During this same period, QPR became embroiled in financial and boardroom controversy. Although the club had floated on the Alternative Investment Market in 1991, in 2001 it entered administration (receivership). A period of financial hardship followed and the club left administration after receiving a £10m high-interest emergency loan which continued to burden the club. Scandals involving the directors, shareholders and others emerged in 2005–06 season and included allegations of blackmail and threats of violence against the club's chairman Gianni Paladini. In an unrelated incident, QPR were further rocked by the murder of youth team player Kiyan Prince on 18 May 2006 and, in August 2007, the death of teenager and promising first-team player Ray Jones in a car crash.

Following this low point in the club's history as Rangers also faced mounting financial pressure, in the same month it was announced that the club had been bought by wealthy Formula One businessmen Flavio Briatore and Bernie Ecclestone (see Ownership and finances below). During the 2007–08 season, Rangers competed in the Football League Championship (see also: 2007–08 Queens Park Rangers F.C. season). John Gregory's reign as manager came to an end in October 2007 after a string of poor results left QPR at the bottom of the Championship and he was replaced by Luigi De Canio until the end of the 2007–08 season. Further investment followed in early 2008 as the club looked to push for promotion to the Premier League within four years, on the back of greater financial stability. On 14 May 2008, Iain Dowie was announced as the manager to begin the campaign to return Rangers to the top flight. However, on 24 October 2008 Dowie was sacked after just 15 games in charge of the club.

On 19 November 2008, QPR named former Portugal midfielder Paulo Sousa as their new first team coach. However, on 9 April 2009, his contract was terminated after he allegedly divulged confidential information without authority. On the same day as Sousa's sacking, player/coach Gareth Ainsworth was appointed as player/caretaker manager for a second time. In June 2009 Jim Magilton was named as new manager of QPR. Despite leading QPR to a good start to the 2009–10 season, a loss of form combined with an alleged head-butting incident with Hungarian midfielder Ákos Buzsáky saw the club further embroiled in controversy. Magilton left the club by mutual consent on 16 December 2009, along with his assistant John Gorman. They were replaced by Paul Hart and Mick Harford on the next day. Less than a month and only five games after becoming manager at QPR, Hart parted with the club on 14 January 2010; the reasons for his leaving the club were unstated.

On 30 April 2011, QPR secured promotion to the Premier League by winning the Championship with a 2–0 win over Watford. A subsequent FA investigation involving QPR's acquisition of Alejandro Faurlín threatened to deduct points from the side and put their promotion into jeopardy. The investigation concluded on 7 May 2011, with QPR found to be at fault in two of the seven charges, and received a £875,000 fine. However, there were no points deducted by the FA, and QPR's promotion to the Premier League was secured.

In January 2012, club chairman Tony Fernandes appointed Mark Hughes as team manager 36 hours after the previous incumbent Neil Warnock was sacked. Following a tough start to his Loftus Road career and after a run of five straight home wins, Hughes and QPR escaped relegation despite a dramatic 3–2 defeat at Manchester City on the last day of the season.

On 23 November 2012, Mark Hughes was sacked after a poor start to the 2012–13 season, having amassed only four points in 12 games and with the club languishing at the bottom of the Premier League despite significant financial investment in new players in the 11 months of Hughes' tenure. A day later, Harry Redknapp was confirmed as the new manager. On 28 April 2013, in a 0–0 draw against fellow relegation rivals Reading, and with three games of the season to play, QPR were relegated from the Premier League down to the Championship after two seasons in the top flight.

During the 2013–14 season, QPR finished fourth in the Championship, and qualified for the play-offs where they defeated Wigan Athletic in the semi-finals. In the final against favourites Derby County on 24 May 2014, QPR won 1–0 with a goal scored by Bobby Zamora in the 90th minute to return to the Premier League.

Following promotion to the Premier League, QPR endured a difficult 2014–15 campaign. Harry Redknapp resigned in February after poor results and mutual frustration with the board. He was replaced by Chris Ramsey. The club finished the season in last place, amassing only 30 points, and were relegated back to the Championship after only one season. After a poor start to the following season, Ramsey was sacked in November 2015 and former manager Neil Warnock returned in interim charge. On 4 December 2015, Jimmy Floyd Hasselbaink was appointed the club's new manager on a rolling contract. Hasselbaink was sacked on 5 November 2016, just 11 months after being in charge. Then six days later QPR reappointed Ian Holloway who was in charge 10 years previously. Holloway left the club at the end of the 2017–18 season.

On 17 May 2018, QPR appointed former England manager Steve McClaren as manager. Despite a promising first half of the season in which the team sat as high as eighth by Christmas, results quickly tailed off following the turn of the year and McClaren was sacked in April 2019 after a 2–1 loss to Bolton.

On 8 May 2019, Mark Warburton was appointed as McClaren's successor on a two-year deal. He signed a new contract ahead of the 2021–22 season. The club played attractive possession based football and challenged for promotion in each of Warburton's three seasons in charge however failed to make the play-offs in any of these seasons. Warburton's contract was not renewed after the 2021–22 season in which a disappointing end to the season saw Rangers drop out of the play-offs where they had spent the majority of the season and finishing 11th. 

Ahead of the 2022–23 season, former Aston Villa and Rangers assistant manager Michael Beale was appointed as manager on a three-year deal on 1 June 2022. Beale was appointed by Rangers in November 2022. On 11 December 2022, former Blackpool manager and Aston Villa assistant Neil Critchley was named QPR manager after signing a 3-and-a-half-year deal. However, after a dismal run of form and dropping to 20th in the EFL Championship, Neil Critchley was sacked after just 46 days in charge, leaving with the lowest win percentage of any manager in their history, winning one match from twelve. He was replaced by former player Gareth Ainsworth, signing from Wycombe Wanderers.

Kits

Grounds
Queens Park Rangers have led a somewhat nomadic existence in their history. The several grounds used prior to 1886 are unknown but were probably in the Queens Park area of London (the first being The Queens Park itself). Thereafter, the club played at 15 different locations in west London and north-west London, but since joining the Football League in 1920, they have only played at two grounds: Loftus Road ( Formally known as Kiyan Prince Foundation Stadium ) and White City Stadium.

Welford Fields (1886–1888)
London Scottish Ground (1888–1889)
Home Farm (1888–1889)
Kensal Green (1888–1889)
Gun Club (1888–1889)
Wormwood Scrubs (1888–1889)
Kilburn Cricket Ground (1888–1889)
Barn Elms (1891)
Kensal Rise Athletic Ground (1899–1901)
Latimer Road (1901–1902)
Kensal Rise Athletic Ground (1902–1904)
Royal Agricultural Society showgrounds (1904–1907)
Park Royal Ground (1907–1917)
Loftus Road (1917–1931)
White City Stadium (1931–1933)
Loftus Road (1933–1962)
White City Stadium (1962–1963)
Loftus Road (1963 –present)

There were plans to build a new 40,000-seater stadium called New Queens Park; however, plans have been shelved with the club looking to build a stadium on the site of the Linford Christie Stadium with 30,000 seats. The club have argued this would bring a huge financial boost to the local area, but their plans were met with some initial scepticism by Hammersmith & Fulham Council.

QPR have also been involved in a long-running legal battle to build a training ground at Warren Farm in Southall. In November 2018, Supreme Court judges rejected the final appeal from local objectors against the proposals, paving the way for the redevelopment of the site to begin. However the club formally abandoned plans for a training ground at Warren Farm on 6 May 2020 replacing it with a plan to develop the site into a community sports centre as the club signed a non-disclosure agreement with an unknown party regarding the freehold of another site. It was announced on 6 July that the club formally secured the freehold of the Heston Sports Ground from Imperial College, with the intention of developing the site into a training ground for the club, with discussions ongoing between the club and Hounslow Council. 

On 31 March 2021, the club obtained planning permission for the redevelopment of Heston Sports Ground into a state of the art training ground, subject to a referral to the Secretary of State. The club received formal support from the Secretary of State on 27 September 2021 along with final planning permission from Hounslow Council being granted, with formal construction beginning on 1 October 2021. The Club aims to move into the £20m facility, (with £6.75m being raised through a bond scheme), by the start of the 2022–23 season, with the final competition date being the 2023–24 season.

In June 2019, the club gifted the stadium naming rights to The Kiyan Prince Foundation, a local charity set up by the father of Kiyan Prince. Prince was a former QPR youth player who was fatally stabbed in 2006. On 25 May 2022, the club announced that the stadium name would revert to Loftus Road ahead of the 2022–23 season.

Supporters and Rivalries

QPR have a modest but loyal fanbase who come from across west London and the home counties. The club have supporters clubs across the world, including the Republic of Ireland, the USA, Australia, Norway, and Sierra Leone. The club's longest running fanzine is A Kick Up The R's, which has been published every month since August 1987 and is sold at both home and away matches.

QPR have long-standing rivalries with several other clubs due to the club's location in West London. The most notable of these is the West London derby against Chelsea. Other rivalries include Brentford, Cardiff, Fulham, and Luton.

The most vocal QPR fans at home games can be found in the Q, P and R Blocks where fans often choose to stand and create the chants which the rest of the support in the Loft and the Stanley Bowles Stand follow.

Songs and Chants
When the club won the League Cup Final in 1967, the club released the single "QPR - The Greatest" about the famous win which featured the vocals of Rangers winger Mark Lazarus.

As the team come on the pitch at Loftus Road and when the team score the song Papa's Got a Brand New Pigbag by post-punk band Pigbag is played with the fans shouting "HOOPS" after the fifth trumpet toot 

At matches Rangers fans sing chants such as "Come On You Rs", "We are the pride of West London, The Blue & The White", "Captain Jack" and "We Are the Rangers Boys"

Famous fans

QPR have a number of celebrity supporters including: comedian Bill Bailey, musicians Peter Doherty (who used to write a QPR fanzine entitled All Quiet On The Western Avenue), Robert Smith of The Cure and Mick Jones of The Clash, politicians Michael Gove and Alan Johnson, actors Shane Richie and Martin Clunes , as well as former England cricketer Alex Tudor.

Records and statistics

Highest attendance: 35,353 vs Leeds United, 27 April 1974, Division 1
Highest all-seated attendance: 19,002 vs Manchester City, 6 November 1999, Division 1
Biggest league win: 9–2 vs Tranmere Rovers, 3 December 1960, Division 3
Biggest league loss: 1–8 vs Manchester United 19 March 1969, Division 1
Biggest home defeat: 0–6 vs Newcastle United, 13 September 2016
Most capped player: Alan McDonald, 52, Northern Ireland
Most league appearances: Tony Ingham, 519, 1950–63
Oldest player: Ray Wilkins, 39 years and 352 days, 1 September 1996, Division 1
Youngest player: Frank Sibley, 15 years and 275 days
Most league goals in a season: George Goddard, 37, Division 3 South, 1929–30.
Most goals in a season: Rodney Marsh, 44 (30 League, 3 FA Cup, 11 League Cup) 1966–67
Most league goals in total aggregate: George Goddard, 174, 1926–34.
Most goals in total aggregate: George Goddard, 186, 1926–34
Record transfer fee received: £19.5 million from Crystal Palace for Ebere Eze, August 2020
Record transfer fee paid: £12.5 million to Anzhi Makhachkala for Christopher Samba, January 2013

QPR in Europe

QPR's first foray into European competition came when they qualified for the 1976–77 UEFA Cup reaching the quarter finals where they were eliminated by AEK Athens on penalties. The club also qualified for the 1984–85 UEFA Cup, but were knocked out in the second round.

Players

First-team squad

The club retired the number 31 shirt as a tribute to former striker Ray Jones who died in 2007.

Out on loan

Development squads

Under-21s squad

Notable former players

Retired numbers

 (2006–2007) posthumous honour

QPR Supporters’ Player of the Year

Source: Myfootballfacts.com

Queens Park Rangers FC 'All Time XI'

Queens Park Rangers fans were asked for a vote for their all time strongest squad in 2008.

 Phil Parkes (1970–79)
 Dave Clement (1965–79)
 Alan McDonald (1981–97)
 Paul Parker (1987–91)
 Ian Gillard (1968–82)
 Trevor Sinclair (1993–98)
 Stan Bowles (1972–79)
 Gerry Francis (1968–79 and 1981–82)
 Dave Thomas (1972–77)
 Les Ferdinand (1987–95)
 Rodney Marsh (1966–72)

Updated 14 May 2019.

Club management

Coaching positions

Managerial history

The last ten permanent managers of QPR:

Ownership and finances

British music, media and sport entrepreneur Chris Wright bought QPR in 1996, eventually relinquishing his majority shareholding in 2001 having ploughed £20 million into Loftus Road over the previous five years; the club struggled financially and went into administration that same year. Following lengthy negotiations in December 2004, Wright agreed to sell his remaining 15% stake; 50% of the money paid to him was given back to QPR, which was significant amount of cash to the club.

After a number of years of financial difficulties which included a period in financial administration, QPR was bought by Formula One tycoons and multi-millionaires Bernie Ecclestone and Flavio Briatore in a £14 million takeover in August 2007. In spending £690,000 to acquire a 69% majority stake in the club from a Monaco-based consortium led by Italian football agent, Antonio Caliendo, Ecclestone spent £150,000 on his 15%, while Briatore bought 54% for £540,000 through a British Virgin Islands registered company, Sarita Capital. In addition, Briatore and Ecclestone were believed to have promised £5 million in convertible loan facilities to help buy players and have covered £13 million of debt, in a total commitment to the club of around £20 million. At the time of purchase, the remaining 31% of shareholders turned down the offer of 1p a share.

On 20 December 2007, it was announced that the family of billionaire Lakshmi Mittal had purchased a 20% shareholding in the club from Flavio Briatore. The purchase price of the 20% stake was just £200,000. As part of the investment Lakshmi Mittal's son-in-law Amit Bhatia took a place on the board of directors. While Gianni Paladini remained chairman of the football club, Alejandro Agag, as chairman of QPR Holdings (the parent company) was the de facto chairman, until he was replaced by Flavio Briatore in early February 2008. Agag moved into the role of managing director, supported by a deputy managing director, Ali Russell, who moved from Hearts in the Scottish Premier League.

Despite QPR's perilous financial condition in 2007–08, the combined personal wealth of the club's new owners – which included the then world's eighth richest man, Lakshmi Mittal – sparked speculation that QPR would receive significant further investment from their new benefactors, drawing parallels with their wealthy West London neighbours Chelsea and Fulham. However, no significant further funds were made available to the club other than those injected as part of the purchase of its share capital, and much of the subsequent player transfer activity involved loan acquisitions or free transfers. Indeed, it was reported in January 2008 that the investors had not discharged the £10 million loan from ABC Corporation – secured on the club's stadium – together with its £1 million annual interest burden—despite the club's prospective annual turnover of between £10 million and £15 million. Furthermore, around £2 million was still owed to former director and major shareholder, Antonio Caliendo, who waived £4.5 million of loans when Briatore and Ecclestone bought the club. It was expected that the ABC loan would be discharged in June 2008 on its maturity and that the debt owed to Caliendo would be paid off "in early 2008" in line with a funding strategy which Ecclestone publicly stated would not result in the wealthy owners simply bankrolling the club. In fact, the ABC loan was discharged on or around 31 July 2008.

Mittal's investment is thought to be primarily motivated by his son-in-law's interests and it was assumed that Mittal himself would remain a silent investor while Briatore, Ecclestone and Bhatia worked together to implement the strategy of slowly building the club up ahead of a push for promotion to the Premier League in 2009. The new owners also pledged to refurbish Loftus Road and use their experience in Formula One to increase sponsorship revenues. On 25 March 2008, QPR confirmed that, from the 2008–09 season and for five seasons, their kits would be supplied by Lotto Sport Italia as part of a number of new partnerships formed by Flavio Briatore. The investment potential of the club's new backers resulted in a number of wildly speculative storylines in the football press throughout the 2007–08 season, including rumoured signings of former World Player of the Year winners Luís Figo and Zinedine Zidane, the latter as a possible manager.

In May 2008, billionaire Vijay Mallya was linked with buying into the club, as part of the Ecclestone, Briatore and Mittal consortium. Following the termination of the club's sponsorship deals with Car Giant, Le Coq Sportif and Sellotape at the end of the 2007–08 season, in early July 2008 it was expected to be announced that Gulf Air would be the new shirt sponsors for three years. Further sponsorship packages were also announced, including Abbey Financial Services and Lotto Sport Italia. On 12 September 2011, Malaysia Airlines and AirAsia announced sponsorship of QPR's shirts for the two seasons, with the sponsorship costing some £6.2 million.

Flavio Briatore's future as QPR chairman came into question in September 2009 after he left the Renault F1 team in the midst of race fixing allegations. The Football League board discussed the matter on 8 October 2009 and declared that they would be awaiting a response from Briatore to various questions before commenting further. Meanwhile, the club continued to make losses (£18.8m in 2008–09 and £13.7m 2009–10). Briatore sold his 62% share to Ecclestone in December 2010, with the Italian possibly retaining a right of first refusal should Ecclestone sell, and initially stepped back from the day-to-day running of the business in favour of Amit Bhatia and Ishan Saksena, the company chairman and managing director respectively. However, his involvement gradually returned, and conflicts between Briatore on the one hand and Bhatia and Saksena on the other resulted in both Bhatia and Saksena leaving QPR in May 2011.

On 18 August 2011, Malaysian businessman Tony Fernandes was unveiled as the majority shareholder after having bought out Ecclestone's 66 percent stake in the club for a rumoured fee of around £35 million, while the Mittal Family retained their 33% stake. Amit Bhatia was restored to his position as vice-chairman. Phillip Beard was announced as the new chief executive of the club and Gianni Paladini removed as club chairman. Briatore and Ecclestone were no longer involved with the club, with no board representation or other financial ties. Bhatia also explained in the takeover announcement that the loan, representing the refinanced ABC Corporation debt secured using the stadium as collateral, had now been "bought off" by the new regime – that is, refinanced by new debt. It is thought that the current debt is represented by a shareholder loan to the club and is non-interest-bearing. Despite the club's fortunes in attracting investors, it continues to be mired in controversy from previous ownership regimes and has been subject to proceedings from former investors Carlos Dunga and Antonio Caliendo.

On 15 August 2018, Bhatia took over as chairman of the club.

Current board of directors and senior management
Updated 15 August 2018.

Honours and achievements
Note: the leagues and divisions of English football have changed somewhat over time, so here they are grouped into their relative levels on the English football league system at the time they were won to allow easy comparison of the achievement

Domestic

League

Football League First Division (1st tier)
Runners-up: 1975–76

Football League Second Division / Championship (2nd tier)
 Champions: 1982–83, 2010–11
 2nd place promotion: 1967–68, 1972–73
 Play-off winners: 2014

Football League Third Division / Third Division South / League One (3rd tier)
 Champions: 1947–48, 1966–67
2nd place promotion: 2003–04

Cup
FA Cup
 Runners-up: 1981–82

League Cup
 Winners: 1966–67
 Runners-up: 1985–86

FA Charity Shield
 Runners-up: 1908, 1912

Minor honours

Division Three South (North Region): 1945–46
Southern League: 1907–08, 1911–12
Western League: 1905–06
 Wartime League South B: 1939–40
 West London Challenge Cup runners-up: 1890–91
 West London Observer Cup: 1891–92, 1892–93
 London Cup: 1895
 Southern Charity Cup: 1913
 Copa De Ibiza: 2005
 Dryworld Cup: 2016

References

External links

Queens Park Rangers Official Website

 
1882 establishments in England
Association football clubs established in 1882
Sport in Hammersmith and Fulham
Football clubs in London
Football clubs in England
English Football League clubs
Premier League clubs
EFL Championship clubs
EFL Cup winners
Companies that have entered administration in the United Kingdom
Tune Group